Sad Pastorale (슬픈 목가 - Seulpeun mokka) is a 1960 South Korean film directed by Kim Ki-young.

Premise
The film is a melodrama about a man who resigns from the army to become a farmer.

Cast
Kim Seok-hun as Kang Byeong-cheol
Kim Ui-hyang as Lee Shin-ok
Choi Eun-hee as Han Do-suk

References

Bibliography

External links

Films directed by Kim Ki-young
1960s Korean-language films
South Korean drama films